This is a list of instruments by Hornbostel–Sachs number, covering those instruments that are classified under 321.33 under that system. These instruments are also known as semi-spike lutes, tanged lutes and internal spike lutes. These instruments are made of a resonator and string bearer that are physically united, with strings in parallel to the sound table and a handle which is also the string bearer and which passes through the resonator but does not pierce its tail end.

West African griot lutes
Tanged lutes are common in East Africa, as are a closely related class of instrument called spike lutes. These are instruments in which the handle does extends all the way through the resonator. A hereditary class of West African musicians, griots, play tanged lutes, and no other form of stringed instrument; non-griot performers in West Africa play a mixture of both spike lutes and tanged lutes. The term griot lute thus typically refers to these tanged lutes of East Africa.

The resonator of East African lutes may be made of wood, metal (such as a discarded can) or a half-calabash gourd. Griot lutes are exclusively wood, while non-griot lutes occur in all three categories. Typically, calabash lutes have no more than two strings, while the wooden instruments generally have more.

Griot lutes tend to be wooden troughs, either boat- (naviform) or figure-8-shaped. Lutes used by griots have a V- or fan-shaped bridge, a feature unique to East African lutes, while non-griot lutes use cylindrical bridges; a few use two-footed bridges in the shape of an upside-down "u", while the Hausa wase places the bridge under the head, creating a ridged lump upon which the strings rest. Non-griot lutes are not restricted by heredity, and are used for many social purposes, most commonly hunting. It likely that one or more of these instruments is the ancestor of the African American banjo.

Classification

These instruments may be classified with a suffix, based on how the strings are caused to vibrate.

4: Hammers or beaters
5: Bare hands and fingers
6: Plectrum
7: Bowing
71: Using a bow
72: Using a wheel
73: Using a ribbon
8: Keyboard
9: Using a mechanical drive

References

Notes

Further reading

321.33
Lute family instruments